Aforia goniodes is a species of sea snail, a marine gastropod mollusk in the family Cochlespiridae.

Description
The shell size varies between 40 mm and 85 mm

(Original description) The high, narrow shell has a biconical shape. It is subscalar, with a long, unconstricted base and a subequal-sided snout, angulated with an expressed keel, and with regular fine spiral threads all over. 
The axial sculpture consists of only fine, regular, close, hair-like line of growth. The spiral sculpture shows in the middle of each whorl a strong angulation formed by the straight drooping line of the shoulder and the straight contracting line down to the inferior suture. The angulation is pinched out into a sharp round-edged keel. There are fine sharpish threads on the whole surface pretty equally distributed and of equal strength. Of these there are on the penultimate whorl below the keel about six. They are parted by flat broadish intervals, strongly scored with the lines of growth.

The colour of the shell is white under a yellow epidermis.

The spire is high, narrow, conical, with profile-lines interrupted by the straight-lined contraction of the shell between the keels of the successive whorls. The apex (eroded) is small and rounded. The spire contains 6-7 whorls. Their profile consists of two straight lines meeting in the keel which bisects the whorls; above is a slowly sloping shoulder, and below a gradual contraction to the suture. The body whorl is scarcely convex on the conical base, which contracts with great regularity to the long, nearly equal-sided snout. The suture is fine, linear, but well defined. The aperture is club-shaped, being rhomboidal above, with a long narrow siphonal canal below. The outer lip is high-arched and then straight along the siphonal canal. Its edge retreats at once to the left, and forms a remote, deep, rounded sinus in the shoulder above the keel. Below this it sweeps out into a high and prominent shoulder. The inner lip is a little concave at the junction of the body and columella, which is straight above, but towards the point is obliquely cut off with a long, narrow, twisted edge, and bends a good deal to the left.

Distribution
This species is distributed in the cold waters along Patagonia, Tierra del Fuego, the Falkland Islands and the South Shetlands.

References

External links
 
  Kantor Y.I., Harasewych M.G. & Puillandre N. (2016). A critical review of Antarctic Conoidea (Neogastropoda). Molluscan Research. DOI: 10.1080/13235818.2015.1128523

goniodes
Gastropods described in 1881